Time Being is an album by Trio 3, a jazz group consisting of saxophonist Oliver Lake, bassist Reggie Workman and drummer Andrew Cyrille.
It was recorded in 2005 and released on the Intakt label.

Reception

The All About Jazz review by Nic Jones states "In the midst of all the derivative stuff, thankfully there is still potent music like this, and as a model of individual and group expression it offers nothing less than a working definition."

Track listing
 "A Chase" (Oliver Lake) – 6:07
 "Medea " (Reggie Workman) – 5:23
 "Tight Rope" (Andrew Cyrille) – 6:17
 "Equilateral" (Lake, Workman, Cyrille) – 8:44
 "Lope" (Oliver Lake) – 4:41
 "Time Was" (Lake, Workman, Cyrille) – 8:43
 "Playing for Keeps" (Lake, Workman, Cyrille) – 6:38
 "Giving (The Whirlwind)" (Andrew Cyrille) – 4:24
 "Time Being" (Lake, Workman, Cyrille) – 5:09
 "Special People" (Andrew Cyrille) – 4:53

Personnel
Oliver Lake - alto saxophone, sopranino saxophone
Reggie Workman – bass
Andrew Cyrille – drums

References

2006 albums
Trio 3 (free jazz trio) albums
Intakt Records albums